Empty Space is the eighth studio album by Lycia, released on 2003 by Silber Records.

Track listing

Personnel
Adapted from the Empty Space liner notes.
Lycia
 John Fair – drum programming
 David Galas – bass guitar
 Tara VanFlower – vocals, design
 Mike VanPortfleet – vocals, guitar, drum machine, design

References

External links 
 
 Empty Space at Bandcamp
 Empty Space at iTunes

2003 albums
Lycia (band) albums